Tuyo (Yours) is the seventeenth studio album by Camilo Sesto. The first audio CD Cassette release was in 1985. Co-produced by P. Robles, the album contains three successful singles; beginning with, "Ven o Voy", as well as "Soy Un Loco Sincero" and "Maldito Destino", which reached "The Billboard Top 40" at the time.

Background
After the rush-release of 1983's ("Amanecer 84)", Sesto would release a record the following year which was considered a "return to form".  For the writing process, he started with very basic melodies, which then sparked the writing process.  He recorded basic tracks live, in the hopes of communicating urgency and excitement.  The advance in playing and production is evident in "Ven o Voy", which features various synth tones and textures, while pushing Sesto's voice further back into the mix.  The mood changes for "Soy Un Loco Sincero", a melody which the near-40 Sesto seems to sing with a wistful look back at his youth.  Another key track is "Cuando Digo Que No", a typical Sesto track, but one with seemingly better instrumentation backing his voice, which sings sharply, elucidating every syllable the way he did during the first few years of his solo career.  Also important is "Mientras Mi Alma Sienta"; a track which contains an adaptation of a piece by legendary writer Tomaso Albioni.

Track listing

Personnel 
 Camilo Sesto – vocals, arrangement, production
 P. Robles – arrangement, production, guitar
 A. Monroy, C. Villa – arrangement, synthesizers, pianos
 C. Blanes – arrangement
 Bruno Vidal, J. Torres – bass
 Antonio Moreno – drums
 José María Castellví, Graf, S.L  – photography
 Antonio Lax – design
Technical
 Mike Vernon – producer
 Gus Dudgeon – engineer

References

Sources

Camilo Sesto albums
Albums produced by Mike Vernon (record producer)
Ariola Records albums
1985 albums